Ypsolopha ustella, the variable ypsolopha moth, is a moth of the family Ypsolophidae. It is found in most of Europe and is also present in North America.

The wingspan is 15–20 mm. It is a variable species with numerous colour forms. Meyrick describes it - Head ferruginous ochreous or grey. Forewings narrower than in Ypsolopha parenthesella, pale grey or pale greyish-ochreous to deep ferruginous-ochreons or dark bronzy; sometimes several small darker spots, or indistinct longitudinal streaks of whitish irroration, or a dark fuscous median longitudinal streak from base to apex; a dark fuscous dot above tornus; a costal patch of thickened membrane between 11 and 12. Hindwings are grey. The larva is green; spots darker.

Adults are on wing from mid-July to April in western Europe, but can be on wing nearly year round depending on the location. The species overwinters as an adult.

The larvae feed on the upperside of the leaves of Quercus species. They live under a slight web. Pupation takes place in a whitish boat-shaped cocoon on a leaf, trunk, or amongst leaf-litter on the ground.

References

External links
waarneming.nl 

Ypsolophidae
Moths described in 1759
Moths of Europe
Moths of North America
Taxa named by Carl Alexander Clerck